The surnames McCabe and MacCabe( ) are Irish and Scottish surnames. McCabes are considered to have moved from the Western Isles of Scotland to Ireland sometime around 1350. McCabes are now found mostly in the United States, Ireland and the United Kingdom, Australia, South Africa, and New Zealand.

Etymology
McCabe and MacCabe are Anglicisations of the Gaelic Mac Cába, a patronymic name meaning "son of Cába". The surname can be written in modern Scottish Gaelic as MacCàba and MacCaibe.

The nickname or personal name Cába is of uncertain origin. Patrick Woulfe considered that the surname was possibly derived from a nickname, meaning "a cap", or "hood". Henry Harrison suggested the name was from the Gaelic Mac Aba, meaning "son of the Abbot". If Harrison is to be believed then the surname would have a similar etymology as the surnames MacNab, McNab, which are from the Gaelic Mac an Aba, Mac an Abadh.

Geographic origins
Bearers of the McCabe and MacCabe surnames are considered to have settled in Ireland from the Western Isles of Scotland sometime around 1350, employed as gallowglass (mercenary soldiers) to the O'Reillys and O'Rourkes which were the principal septs of Breffny. According to a pedigree written by Dubhaltach Mac Fhirbhisigh, the MacCabes descend from the MacLeods and king Sitric Silkenbeard. In time the MacCabes became a recognised Irish sept, with the chieftain being called "Constable of the two Breffnys". According to MacLysaght in the mid 20th century, statistics then showed that the surname was more numerous in the Breffny area than anywhere else. MacCabe landowners are more associated with County Monaghan and County Cavan, but the principal families of the name lost all their estates after the Battle of Aughrim in 1691.

Coat of arms
According to a genealogy which purports to date from the 17th century, Alexander MacCabe (fl.1689) was a descendant of the last chieftains of the MacCabes. Within the genealogy, his arms are blazoned: vert a fesse wavy between three salmons naiant argent; crest a demi-griffon segreant; motto aut vincere aut mori.

Present day distribution

McCabes are now found mostly in the United States, Ireland and the United Kingdom, Australia, South Africa, and New Zealand. The number of McCabes as of 2014 was as follows:

In the 1990 United States Census, McCabe was ranked 1,200th most common surname, and MacCabe was ranked 43,031st. At the 2000 United States Census neither ranked among the top 1,000 most common surnames.

Notable people with the surname McCabe or MacCabe

See also
 , reduced form of MacCabe

References

External links 

 McCabe Y-DNA Project. The McCabe group was one of the first on FamilyTreeDNA, with member kit numbers in the 800s.

Anglicised Irish-language surnames
Anglicised Scottish Gaelic-language surnames
Scottish surnames
Patronymic surnames

de:McCabe
fr:McCabe